Larry Marks may refer to:
Larry Marks (American football) (1902–1974), American player in the National Football League
 Larry Marks (boxer) (born 1972), American professional boxer

See also
 Larry Markes (1921–1999), American comedian, singer and screenwriter